In physics and mathematics, a number of ideas are named after Henri Poincaré:
 Euler–Poincaré characteristic
 Hilbert–Poincaré series
 Poincaré–Bendixson theorem
 Poincaré–Birkhoff theorem
 Poincaré–Birkhoff–Witt theorem, usually known as the PBW theorem
 Poincaré algebra
K-Poincaré algebra
Super-Poincaré algebra
 Poincaré–Bjerknes circulation theorem
 Poincaré complex
 Poincaré conjecture, one of the Millennium Prize Problems
Generalized Poincaré conjecture
 Poincaré disk model, a model of hyperbolic geometry
 Poincaré duality
Twisted Poincaré duality
 Poincaré–Einstein synchronization
 Poincaré expansion
 Poincaré group, the group of isometries of Minkowski spacetime, named in honour of Henri Poincaré
K-Poincaré group
 Poincaré half-plane model, a model of two-dimensional hyperbolic geometry
 Poincaré homology sphere
 Poincaré–Hopf theorem
 Poincaré inequality
Poincaré–Wirtinger inequality
 Poincaré–Lelong equation
 Poincaré lemma
 Poincaré-Lefschetz duality
 Poincaré–Lindstedt method
 Poincaré line bundle
 Poincaré map
 Poincaré metric
 Poincaré–Miranda theorem
 Poincaré–Neumann operator
 Poincaré plot
 Poincaré polynomial
 Poincaré recurrence
 Poincaré residue
 Poincaré separation theorem
 Poincaré series (modular form)
 Poincaré space
 Poincaré sphere (optics)
 Poincaré–Steklov operator
 Poincaré symmetry
 Poincaré wave

Other
Annales Henri Poincaré
Institut Henri Poincaré
Henri Poincaré Prize
Henri Poincaré University
Poincaré and the Three-Body Problem
Poincaré (crater)
Poincaré Medal
Poincaré Seminars

Books with the title "Henri Poincaré"

References

Poincare
Henri Poincaré